Parmelia protosignifera is a species of foliose lichen in the large family Parmeliaceae. Found in Australasia, it was described as a new species in 1988 by lichenologists John Elix and Jen Johnston. The type specimen was collected on sheltered granite ledges in Eucalyptus woodland on the eastern slopes on Tinderry Peak in New South Wales. It has also been collected in Victoria, as well as South Island and Stewart Island of New Zealand.

Description
Soredia and isidia are absent from the thallus. Ascospores are 11–15 by 8–9 µm.

Parmelia protosignifera is morphologically quite similar to Notoparmelia signifera, a species with which it has been previously confused, and after which it is named. The two lichens can be distinguished chemically: P. protosignifera has salazinic acid in the medulla, resulting in a K+ yellow-dark red spot test, while N. signifera contains protocetraric acid, which leads to a K+ pale yellow-brown spot test.

References

protosignifera
Lichen species
Lichens described in 1988
Lichens of Australia
Lichens of New Zealand
Taxa named by John Alan Elix